Below are the results of the 2007 Biathlon World Championships 2007 for the men's relay, which took place on 11 February 2007.

Results

References 

Women's Relay
2007 in Italian women's sport